Thomas Penn was the son of William Penn.

Thomas or Tom Penn may also refer to:

Thomas Penn (historian)
Tom Penn, sports executive
Tom Penn (footballer)